A recruiting sergeant is a British or American soldier of the rank of sergeant who is tasked to enlist recruits. The term originated in the British army of the eighteenth and nineteenth centuries.

The playwright George Farquhar served as an infantry officer, and the characters in his play The Recruiting Officer (1706) are drawn from life.

The unscrupulous methods used by some to trick the innocent have been the subject of several traditional songs composed by their victims as a warning to others, popular examples being the Irish traditional song Arthur McBride and the Scots Twa Recruiting Sergeants.

A recruit would be given the King's shilling as a mark of the contract made.

The term has passed into the English language to mean any set of  circumstances which recruits or fails to recruit volunteers to the army. See Daily Telegraph headline
The CIA is al-Qaeda's best recruiting sergeant

See also
 Press gang - Officially sanctioned  gangs who once kidnapped people to serve in the military or navy, usually by force and without notice.

References
Drumming up business The Soldier's Trade in a Changing World By Professor Richard Holmes. bbc.co.uk - Accessed February 2007
Definition at Free Dictionary
Irish song lyrics
Newfoundland song lyrics

Military recruitment